Ian Robert Callaghan MBE (born 10 April 1942) is an English retired professional footballer who played as a midfielder. He holds the record for most appearances for Liverpool. He was appointed a Member of the Order of the British Empire (MBE) in the 1975 New Year Honours.

Playing career

Liverpool 

Callaghan played 857 times for Liverpool between 1960 and 1978, breaking into the first team just after the appointment of Bill Shankly as Liverpool manager. He made his debut on 16 April 1960 at Anfield in a 4–0 victory over Bristol Rovers. He was a regular member of the first team by the time Liverpool won promotion to the First Division in 1962, and went on to help them win the league title in 1964, 1966, 1973, 1976 and 1977, as well as the 1965 and 1974 FA Cup Finals, the UEFA Cup in 1973 UEFA Cup Final and 1976 UEFA Cup Final, and the European Cup in 1977 and (as a substitute) in 1978. He was voted FWA Footballer of the Year in 1974. He was booked only once in his career, in the 1978 League Cup Final replay at Old Trafford, which Liverpool lost to Nottingham Forest.

Callaghan played in the 1977 European Cup Final, when Liverpool beat Borussia Mönchengladbach 3–1, but in the 1978 season, which proved his last year at the club, his playing time was reduced as younger additions like Graeme Souness and Kenny Dalglish established themselves at the club. Callaghan was on the substitutes' bench when Liverpool retained the European Cup against FC Brugge in 1978.

Later club career 
He left Liverpool shortly after the 1978 European Cup final and signed for Swansea City, managed by former Liverpool striker John Toshack. He helped Swansea win a second successive promotion in 1979, which took them into the Second Division, and also had brief spells playing in the US, Australia and Ireland towards the end of his career. He spent the final season of his career in the English Fourth Division with Crewe Alexandra, making 15 appearances in the 1981–82 season and retiring as a player in his 40th year.

England 
Callaghan played four times at senior level for England. Although he was in the squad for the 1966 FIFA World Cup, he did not play in the final and so did not receive a medal. He did play in the group-stage match versus France on 20 July 1966, one of three wingers tried before manager Alf Ramsey decided to go with a team with no wingers. Following a Football Association-led campaign to persuade FIFA to award medals to all the winners' squad members, Callaghan was presented with his medal by Prime Minister Gordon Brown at a ceremony at 10 Downing Street on 10 June 2009.

After that 1966 match against France, Callaghan's next England appearance, his third, came against Switzerland on 7 September 1977, aged 35. This gap of 11 years 49 days between appearances is the longest such interval for any England player.

Career statistics 

* Includes one appearance in the FA Charity Shield

^ Includes one goal in the FA Charity Shield

Honours 
Liverpool
Football League First Division: 1963–64, 1965–66, 1972–73, 1975–76, 1976–77
Football League Second Division: 1961–62
FA Cup: 1964–65, 1973–74
FA Charity Shield: 1964 (shared), 1965 (shared), 1966, 1974, 1976, 1977
European Cup: 1976–77, 1977–78
UEFA Cup: 1972–73, 1975–76
European Super Cup: 1977

England
FIFA World Cup: 1966

See also 
List of men's footballers with the most official appearances

References

External links 

Official profile at Liverpoolfc.tv
Player profile at LFChistory.net
Football heroes at sporting-heroes.net
Thisisanfield.com Forgotten Heroes
The Ian Callaghan interview at LFChistory.net 
Ian Callaghan interview at Liverpoolway.co.uk 
Ian Callaghan at Aussie Footballers

1942 births
Living people
People from Toxteth
Footballers from Liverpool
English footballers
Association football midfielders
Liverpool F.C. players
Fort Lauderdale Strikers (1977–1983) players
Swansea City A.F.C. players
Canberra City FC players
Crewe Alexandra F.C. players
English Football League players
English Football League representative players
North American Soccer League (1968–1984) players
League of Ireland players
UEFA Cup winning players
UEFA Champions League winning players
England under-23 international footballers
England international footballers
1966 FIFA World Cup players
FIFA World Cup-winning players
English Football Hall of Fame inductees
English expatriate footballers
English expatriate sportspeople in the United States
English expatriate sportspeople in Australia
English expatriate sportspeople in Ireland
Expatriate soccer players in the United States
Expatriate soccer players in Australia
National Soccer League (Australia) players
Expatriate association footballers in the Republic of Ireland
Members of the Order of the British Empire
FA Cup Final players